Sodium salts are salts composed of a sodium cation  and the conjugate base anion of some inorganic or organic acids. They can be formed by the neutralization of such acids with sodium hydroxide.

Categorization
Sodium salts can be categorized into:
sodium salts of carboxylic acids (e. g. sodium formate, HCOONa, the sodium salt of formic acid or sodium acetate, CH3COONa, the sodium salt of acetic acid, etc.) and 
sodium salts of inorganic acids (sulfonic acids etc.)

Organic sodium salts

Drugs
In pharmaceutical technology acidic pharmaceutical substances are often converted into sodium salts, because they are more stable, more soluble or membrane-permeable (bioavailable) than the base compound. Examples of such sodium salts are (selection): Bispyribac, bithionol, bosentan, brequinar, bromfenac, Cefmenoxime, ceftiofur, citicoline, diclofenac , Floxacillin, fosinopril, Mordant brown 33, naproxen, Netobimin, ozagrel, pantoprazole, pemetrexed, secobarbital, sitamaquin, sitaxentan, sulfamiderazin, sulfapyridine, sulfaquinoxaline, sulfathiazole, sulfazecin, thiamylal and mesna. The disodium salt of cromolyn is also used as drug. Most of these salts are sodium salts of organic carboxylic acids or sulfonic acids.

Plant protection agents
Herbicides are often used as sodium salts for the reasons discussed above. One example is the sodium salt of methylflupyrsulfuron (CAS-No. 144740-54-5).

Cosmetics
Sodium salts of long chain sulfonic acids (e.g. sodium lauryl sulfate) are often included in toothpaste and shampoo. The sodium salts of fatty acids may serve as soaps and can therefore be called sodium soaps.

Dye production
Sodium salts of certain aromatic sulfonic acids - particularly naphthalenesulfonic acid - are used in the preparation of azo dyes.

Inorganic sodium salts
Examples of important inorganic sodium salts are sodium fluoride, sodium chloride, sodium bromide, sodium iodide, sodium sulfate, sodium bicarbonate and sodium carbonate. Sodium amide (NaNH2) is the sodium salt of ammonia (NH3).

References

Sodium compounds